Maqtu may refer to:
 Maqtu-e Olya
 Maqtu-e Sofla
 Maqtu-e Vosta

The word can also be a Romanisation of the Arabic literary genre-term maqṭūʿ.

See also
 Magtu (disambiguation)